is a former Japanese football player.

Playing career
Ogami was born in Hiroshima on June 7, 1970. After graduating from University of Tsukuba, he joined Yamaha Motors (later Júbilo Iwata) in 1993. He could hardly play in the match behind Shinichi Morishita and Dido Havenaar until 1995. In 1996, he became a regular goalkeeper. In 1997 and 1998, he played in all matches and he was selected Best Eleven in 1997. The club also won the champions 1997 J1 League and 1998 J.League Cup. In April 1999, the club won the champions 1998–99 Asian Club Championship first Asian title in the club history. However he lost his regular position for injury in late 1999. From 2000, he could hardly play in the match behind Yushi Ozaki and Arno van Zwam. In 2002, he moved to Avispa Fukuoka. He played as regular goalkeeper in 2002. However he could not play at all in the match behind Hideki Tsukamoto and Yuichi Mizutani from 2003. He retired end of 2004 season.

Club statistics

Honours

Club
Júbilo Iwata
 AFC Champions League: 1998–99
 Asian Super Cup: 1999
 J1 League: 1997, 1999
 J.League Cup: 1998
 Japanese Super Cup: 2000

Individual
J.League Best XI - 1997

References

External links

1970 births
Living people
University of Tsukuba alumni
Association football people from Hiroshima Prefecture
Japanese footballers
J1 League players
J2 League players
Japan Football League (1992–1998) players
Júbilo Iwata players
Avispa Fukuoka players
Association football goalkeepers